Om Namah Shivay is an Indian television series that aired on DD National based on Shiv Puran. The series is presumably named after the mantra Aum Namah Shivaya.

Plot
The plot centers around Lord Shiva and brings Hindu theology to life in a series of interconnected stories.  The serial begins with the creation of the universe and the other Devas, then guides the viewer through Shiva's marriage to Sati, Sati's death, Shiva's marriage to Parvati, and tales of many devotional acts, demonic battles, and important religious events (such as the creation of the twelve Jyotirlinga).  It ends with events covered in the Mahābhārata and the blessing of the hero Arjuna by Shiva.

According to the show's introduce the material used to construct the show's plot and the script was extensive. Sources listed are the Vayu Puran, Shiv Maha Puran, Skand Puran, Ling Puran, Tantra Chooramani, Valmiki Ramayan, Swetashwar Upanishad, Vaman Puran, Varah Puran, Koorma Puran, Rudra Yamal Tantra, Padma Puran, Devi Bhagwat Puran, and Bhagwat Puran.  Director Dheeraj Kumar, a devotee of Lord Shiva, oversaw nine years of research to ensure that Om Namah Shivay'''s story was complete and accurate; nonetheless, the opening credits begin with an apology for any errors that may have been made in the series.

Cast
 Samar Jai Singh as Kailashpati 
Mahadev Bhagwan Bholenath Shivashankar Shiva
 Yashodhan Rana as Kamadeva/ Kailashpati Mahadev Bhagwan Bholenath Shivshankar Shiva
 Manjeet Kullar as Devi Sati / Devi Sati
 Gayatri Shastri as Devi Parvati / Parvati,Nav Durga
 Jagesh Mukati as Agra Puja Ke Gauriputra Vignaharta Mangalmurti Shree Ganesha
 Saurabh Agarwal as Devsenapati Kumar Kartikeya
Rajeshwari Sachdeva as Kamdevpatni Devi Rati 
 Amit Pachori as Trilokhinath Jagdishwar Jagatpalak Bhagwan Shree Hari Vishnu
 Anita Kulkarni as Vishnupriya Devi Lakshmi 
Reena Kapoor as Vishnupriya Devi Lakshmi
 Kishori Shahane Vij as Rajkumari Sumati / Grahpati Suryadeva's wives Sandhya and Chhaya
 Sandeep Mohan as Rama / Maharaj Vajrasena
 Siraj Mustafa Khan as Dwarakadheesh Bhagwan Shree Krishna
 Sandeep Mehta as Narada
 Sunil Nagar as Brahmadeva
 Mona Parekh as Devi Saraswati
 Sanjay Swaraj as Devraj Indra
 Shailey Chowdhary as Devi Shachi,the wife of Devraj Indra 
 Firdaus Mevawala as Devguru Brihaspati
 Santosh Shukla as Chandradeva
 Dharmendra Rana as Varundeva
 Priyanka Puthran as Devi Kaushiki
 Gautam Chaturvedi as Rajkumar Bhadrayu / Samrat Yudhishthira
 Shalini Kapoor Sagar as Rajkumari Karkati
 Chand Dhar as Daittyaguru Shukracharya
 Gajendra Chauhan as Daksha 
 Kshama Raj as MaharaniVerni
 Nimai Bali as Jalandhara / Shanideva / Duryodhana / Sindoorasura
 Rajesh Shringarpure / Rajesh Shringarpore as Arjuna
 Gufi Paintal as Shakuni
 Upasana Singh as Mohini
 Sarvadaman D. Banerjee as Rajkumar Vrishdhwaja / Kanapa 
 Kaushal Kapoor as Andhakasura / Kadambha
 Vaquar Shaikh as Lankapati Lankeshwar Ravana
Pappu Polyester as Ganpramuk Nandi Maharaj / Nandi
 Kulraj Bedi as Kumbhakarna
 Raman Khatri as Vibhishana / Hiranyakashipu / Bhasmasura
 Govind Khatri as Hiranyaksha / Rambha / Sumeru Parvat]] 
 Radhakrishna Dutta as Vidura
 Pankaj Kalra as Maharishi Durvasa/ Maharishi Dadhichi 
 Qasim Ali as Dushasana
 Navneet Chaddha as Nakula
 Keerti Gaekwad Kelkar as Maharani Draupadi
 Daman Maan as Mahishasura
 Utkarsha Naik as Kaikesi / Diti
 Arun Mathur as Sumali/ Nagraj Vasuki / Daittyaraj Ruru 
 Manish Sharma as Meghnad
 Amrit Pal (actor)|Amrit Pal]] as Tarakasura
 Mahendra Ghule as Kamalaksha / Bhimsena / Hanuman / Singhrasura 
Deepak Jethi as Vidyunmali
 Sanjeev Siddharth as Tarakaksha
 Prateek Bohara asShumbha / Grahpati Suryadeva
 Anil Yadav as Nishumbha / Parashurama
Firoz Ali as Agnideva
Renuka Israni as Maharani Ketumati
Jitendra Trehan as Nagraj Vasuki
Aroop Pal as Prithvi Manushya Maharaj Chitrangada
Jaya Mathur as Maharani Simantini
Kirti Singh (actor) / Kirti Singh as Devi Tilottama / Devi Vrinda]]
Sanjeev Sharma as Bhaktaraj Prahlada / Maharaj Bhagiratha

Soundtrack
Songs from many well-known Indian singers are featured in this serial; a few examples include the title song "Om Namah Shivay" (Pandit Jasraj), "Rudra Rudra" (Vinod Rathod and Udit Narayan, episode 53), and "Trikal Darsh" (episode 89), "Man Mein Ek Kamna" (episode 62), and "Maha Shivratri Aayi" (Alka Yagnik). Sharang Dev composed music and Abhilash provided lyrics.

Unity is created in the series by using the same songs for different scenes, or even the same melodies with different lyrics, to soundtrack a recurring theme or situation.  For example, the creation of each Jyotirling is accompanied by a chorus of the song "Ajar Amar Shiv Shankar."  "Dharm Na Janu," sung by the boy Upmanyyu in episode 58, later becomes the melody for the song "Jeevan Kya Hai," which the young Markandeya sings in episode 168; each child sings to seek Shiva's protection through prayer.  Indra, Narada, and the Devatas sing "Om Shri Tripund Dhari" to ask rescue from Shiva in episode 56; Sachi then sings the same melody as a prayer to Shakti, "Jai Shakti Dayini Maa," in episode 100.

Continuity is also created between different performers with music.  For instance, the song "Maha Shivratri Aayi" is sung by Shiva's first wife Sati, and then by his second wife Parvati, both celebrating the great festival of Maha Shivaratri.

Home video
In 2003, Om Namah Shivay'' was released as a two-part, 42-DVD set, distributed by Madhu Entertainment and Media.  It includes an option for English subtitles and a choice of four languages for audio (Hindi, Tamil, Telugu, and Malayalam).

References

External links
 

1997 Indian television series debuts
2001 Indian television series endings
DD National original programming
Indian television series about Hindu deities